Orphx is a Canadian music duo made up of Rich Oddie and Christina Sealey who perform techno, industrial and experimental music. They have performed worldwide and have numerous releases on CD, vinyl and cassette through independent music labels such as Sonic Groove, Hands Productions, Hymen Records, and Hospital Productions.

History

Orphx was created in late 1993 in the Canadian city of Hamilton, Ontario by Rich Oddie, Christina Sealey and Aron West.   Their early output was a development of early industrial music and power electronics but they soon began introducing elements of techno, electro and dub. Oddie and West created the Xcreteria cassette label to release and distribute recordings from Orphx and related projects. West left in 1995 to focus on the noise project Tropism. By 1997, Oddie and Sealey were working closely with Germany's Hands label and performing regularly in Europe as part of the "rhythmic noise" scene. Most studio recordings between 1997 and 2008 are credited to Oddie, while more recent recordings are often attributed to both Oddie and Sealey.

Since 2009, Orphx has been working primarily with the Sonic Groove label and has become more prominent within the worldwide techno scene. They have appeared at international festivals and celebrated venues around the world, including Berghain, Berlin Atonal, Katharsis, Khidi, Labyrinth, Movement, Mutek, Rural Festival, Unsound, and Tresor. In 2008, Sealey began experimenting with modular synthesizers, which quickly became a key feature of their live performances and recordings. Orphx was featured in I Dream of Wires, a 2014 documentary on the resurgence of modular synthesizers, and Industrial Soundtrack For The Urban Decay, a 2015 documentary on the history of industrial music.

Orphx have released sixteen albums and numerous singles on cassette, CD, and vinyl, as well as video releases. In recent years, they have created many remixes for other artists including Conrad Schnitzler, Front Line Assembly, Oscar Mulero, Nomeansno, Perc, and Svreca.  Existing side projects include Eschaton (Orphx + Ancient Methods), O/H (Rich Oddie + Dave Foster), Oureboros (Rich Oddie + Aron West), and collaborative live performances and releases with JK Flesh (Justin Broadrick).

Orphx releases are often based around social, political or psychological / spiritual themes. Circuitbreaking (Hymen, 2004) was a political commentary on economic globalization, Insurgent Flows (Hands, 2005) was a response to US imperialism in Iraq, and Pitch Black Mirror (Sonic Groove / Hands, 2016) explored themes of depression and redemption. The Pitch Black Mirror album and other recent releases combine industrial techno rhythms with post-punk influences and a more prominent use of vocals

Releases

References

External links
 Official website
 Discography at Discogs.com
 Tropism website
 The Infant Cycle via The Ceiling

Canadian electronic musicians
Musical groups from Hamilton, Ontario
Musical groups established in 1994
1994 establishments in Ontario